Divyendu Sharma (born 19 June 1983) is an Indian actor and model best known for his roles of Nishant aka Liquid in Pyar Ka Punchnama, Narayan Sharma in Toilet: Ek Prem Katha, Sundar Tripathi in the film Batti Gul Meter Chalu and Munna Bhaiya in Amazon Prime Video series Mirzapur.

Personal life
Divyenndu was born on 19 June 1983 in Delhi. He is a graduate in political science from Delhi University's Kirori Mal College. He has three years of theatre experience in Delhi after which he pursued a two-year diploma in acting from FTII, Pune. He was previously seen in a number of ads for brands like Virgin Mobile, Birla Sun Life and Fidelity Mutual Funds. He is married to Akanksha Sharma.

In 2019, Divyenndu dropped his surname citing numerology and his belief that, in a country like India, it's important to remove the many caste divisions. His official documents, however, use his full name.

Career
He first appeared in a sight role in Madhuri Dixit's comeback movie after Aaja Nachle. His debut Bollywood movie was Pyar Ka Punchnama, where he played a character called Liquid. For his role in the film, he won the Screen Award for Most Promising Newcomer – Male. He also played the role of the poet Omi in David Dhawan's remake of Chashme Baddoor.

Filmography

Films

Web series

References

External links
 
 
 
 

1983 births
Living people
People from Delhi
Film and Television Institute of India alumni
Kirori Mal College alumni
Male actors in Hindi cinema
Indian male film actors
Screen Awards winners
Zee Cine Awards winners